Peter Schwartz (born 1949) is an American journalist. He is an Objectivist and writes opinion pieces and books from that viewpoint.

Career
A former chairman of the board, and currently a distinguished fellow, of the Ayn Rand Institute, Schwartz writes and lectures on a variety of topics, including environmentalism, foreign policy, political philosophy and ethics. He received a Master of Arts in journalism from Syracuse University and has taught advanced writing classes at the Ayn Rand Institute's Objectivist Academic Center.

He is the author of In Defense of Selfishness: Why the Code of Self-Sacrifice Is Unjust and Destructive; The Foreign Policy of Self-Interest: A Moral Ideal for America; Libertarianism: The Perversion of Liberty; and  The Battle for Laissez-Faire Capitalism. He also writes on current issues for his blog, PeterSchwartz.com.

His articles have been published in The Washington Post, the Chicago Tribune, ForbesOnline, Huffington Post and the Hartford Courant.

He was the founding editor and publisher of The Intellectual Activist (1979–1991), a periodical that covered political and social issues from a pro-individual rights perspective. From 1987 to 2003, he was president and editor-in-chief at Second Renaissance Books, a book publisher and distributor.

Schwartz edited two collections of essays by Ayn Rand: The Ayn Rand Column and Return of the Primitive: The Anti-Industrial Revolution, for which he was also a contributing author. He was also co-editor, with Marlene Podritske, of Objectively Speaking: Ayn Rand Interviewed.

Published works
"Libertarianism: The Perversion of Liberty" (chapter) in The Voice of Reason: Essays in Objectivist Thought (New American Library, 1988) 
"Israel Does Not Violate Palestinian Civil Rights" (chapter) in Israel: Opposing Viewpoint (Greenhaven Press, 1989) 
"Gender Tribalism," "The Philosophy of Privation" and "Multicultural Nihilism" (chapters) in Return of the Primitive: The Anti-Industrial Revolution (Meridian, 1999) 
Introduction to The Art of Nonfiction (Plume., 2001) 
"Racial 'Diversity' Is Racism" (chapter) in Racism: Current Controversies (Greenhaven Press, 2003) 
The Foreign Policy of Self-Interest: A Moral Ideal for America (ARI Press, 2004) 
"Moral Values Without Religion" in Indianapolis Post-Tribune, June 2, 2005
"Israel Has a Right to Exist" (chapter, co-authored with Yaron Brook) in Israel: Opposing Viewpoints (Greenhaven Press, 2005) 
"In Defense of Income Inequality" in Tampa Tribune, March 10, 2007
"Why Is the Tea Party 'Extremist'"? at Forbes Online, November 11, 2013
"The Opponents of ObamaCare Are Completely Missing The Point" at Forbes Online, December 12, 2013
"Objecting to the 'Season of Giving'" in the Washington Post, December 19, 2014
"Christmas with Ayn Rand" in the Chicago Tribune, December 23, 2014
"A Real Right to Life" at Huffington Post, January 12, 2015
In Defense of Selfishness: Why the Code of Self-Sacrifice Is Unjust and Destructive (Palgrave Macmillan, June 2015)

Lectures
Schwartz lectures on college campuses and at various conferences. He has been interviewed on radio and TV by such personalities as Geraldo Rivera and Thom Hartmann.
His lectures include:
The Writing Process
Capitalism and Selfishness
Clarity in Conceptualization: The Art of Identifying “Package-Deals”
Barriers to Cognition
The Epistemology of Altruism
The “Diversity” Delusion
The Virtue of Selfishness: Why Achieving Your Happiness Is Your Highest Moral Purpose
America's Foreign Policy: Self-Interest vs Self-Sacrifice
Free Minds and Free Markets

References

External links
 

Objectivists
American atheism activists
Syracuse University alumni
Living people
1949 births
Ayn Rand Institute